There are two places named Broadview in the U.S. state of New Mexico:

Broadview, Cibola County, New Mexico, a census-designated place
Broadview, Curry County, New Mexico, an unincorporated community